Stemma (plural stemmata) may refer to:

 In stemmatics, an approach to textual criticism, a stemma or stemma codicum is a diagram showing the relationships of the various versions of a text to earlier versions or manuscripts
 Tree-like diagrams representing sentence structure and syntax created by Lucien Tesnière
 Coat of arms or arms in the Italian language
A family tree or recorded genealogy

 Stemmata refers to a class of simple eyes in arthropods
 Kind of empire crown in the late Roman, the Byzantine and the Bulgarian empires